The M3 Scout Car (known as the White Scout Car in British Commonwealth service) was an American-produced armored car. The original M3 Scout Car was produced in limited numbers, while the improved M3A1 Scout Car saw wide service during World War II and after.

Design
The main production variant, the M3A1 Scout Car, was a lightly armored, open topped, machine gun armed, four wheel drive vehicle designed to be used in the reconnaissance role. The M3A1 Scout Car was crewed by a driver and commander, while there was seating for six additional occupants in the rear.

The underside protection was also limited, giving little protection from the effects of land mines for the vehicle’s occupants.

The M3A1 Scout Car was typically armed with a 0.5 cal (12.7 mm) M2 Browning heavy machine gun and one or two .30 cal (7.62 mm) M1919 Browning machine guns, all were mounted on a skate rail upon which the pintle mounts could be moved about. Due to its open top, the occupants were also able to employ their personal weapons.

History

Development

M1 Scout Car
The M1 Scout Car was the first of a new series of armored cars developed by the White Motor Company for the US Army. Tested in 1934, the M1 Scout Car was an improvised, open topped four-wheel drive vehicle based on a commercial White ½-ton truck design. Seventy-six M1 Scout Cars were delivered to the US Army.

M2 Scout Car
The M2 Scout Car was a development of the M1, tested in 1935 the almost identical looking M2 was larger and more powerful, designed with as many commercial components as possible to keep costs down it could accommodate a crew of seven. Twenty M2 Scout Cars were delivered to the US Army.

M2A1 / M3 Scout Car
The M2A1 Scout Car, later redesignated the M3 Scout Car, was a further development of the M1 and M2 Scout Cars. Sixty-four M2A1 / M3 Scout Cars were produced, all being assigned to the 7th Cavalry Brigade.

M3A1 Scout Car
The M3A1 Scout Car was the final development of the series. Primary external differences from the M3 were a widening of the body over the fenders, the removal of the rear door of the M3 and the addition of the front roller. Internally, the M3A1 had an improved engine and was fitted with the machine gun skate rail. A total of 20,918 were produced between 1939–1944. It was the only version to see service outside of the United States.

Variants

The M3A1E1 Scout Car was developed to increase the range and fuel economy of the vehicle, it was powered by an  Buda-Lanova 6DT-317 six-cylinder diesel engine. 3,340 were produced, all were sent to the Soviet Union.

The M3A1E2 Scout Car was a version with an armored roof. 

The M3A1E3 Scout Car was an experimental version fitted with a pedestal mounted 37 mm Gun M3. 

The M3A1 Command Car was a command version, fitted with an armoured screen and additional side armor.

The M2 Half Track was developed from the M3A1 Scout Car by adding half tracks to the rear of the vehicle. The post-War BTR-40 was a Soviet development of the M3A1 Scout Car concept.

Service

United States 

The M3A1 was used by cavalry units of the US Army in its intended cavalry role during the North African campaign and the invasion of Sicily, being employed for reconnaissance, screening and as an armored command vehicle. The M3A1 was fast and reliable, making it popular with its crews. However, it was a major disappointment in its intended role, because of its poor off-road performance and its lack of overhead protection. Cavalry units were forced to supplement it with the M2 Half-Track Car and the larger M3 Half-tracks.

Throughout 1943, most US Army units replaced the M3A1 with the M8 Greyhound armored car and the similar M20 Utility Car, although the M3A1 was retained for rear area security and convoy escort duties. A small number of M3A1s were employed in the Normandy campaign. A few M3A1s were used by the US Marine Corps in the Pacific theater, but none saw combat.

General George Patton used an M3A1 as a command vehicle, modified with additional armor and a raised fighting compartment.

A total of 11,401 M3A1 Scout Cars were allocated for supply to US allies under Lend-Lease, 6,987 were supplied to the British Commonwealth, 3,310 to the Soviet Union and 104 to the Chinese Nationalist Army. Some were also supplied to Free Belgian, Free French, Czechoslovak and Polish units.

Britain 

In British Commonwealth service, the White Scout Car was regarded more as an armored truck, reflected in the designation "Truck, 15cwt, 4x4, Armoured Personnel", and was used in a variety of secondary roles, being issued to engineer, artillery (as an observation vehicle for field artillery observers) medical (as a protected ambulance) and signals units; within the Royal Armoured Corps’ Tank and Armoured Car Regiments it usually served in Squadron or Regimental  headquarters. It was used by British Commonwealth forces in every theatre they fought in except Burma.

Soviet Union 

In Soviet Red Army service, the M3A1 was used as an armored personnel carrier by brigade and corps reconnaissance units and motorcycle battalions and regiments, operating alongside the BA-64 armored car. The M3A1 was also used as an armored command vehicle and a gun tractor for the ZIS-3 76-mm field gun, although the towing hitch proved to be unreliable, the M3A1 remained in widespread service throughout the war.

China 

The Chinese Nationalist Army received M3A1 Scout Cars from 1942 and used them throughout the Second Sino-Japanese War and the Chinese Civil War.

Postwar service 

After the war, many vehicles were sold, mostly to Asian and Latin American countries while they remained in Soviet service until 1947. A few vehicles were used by Israel in the 1948 Arab–Israeli War. At least one Israeli M3A1 was modified with top armor and a revolving turret. France employed its M3A1s in the First Indochina War  and the Algerian War. By late 1990, the only country with M3A1s remaining in service was the Dominican Republic.

Operators

Second World War
 
 
 
  Free Czechoslovakia
 
  Dutch East Indies - 40 vehicles, out of an order of 400, were delivered before the colony was overrun by Japan.
 
  - captured vehicles.
  - M3A1s used by 2nd NZ Division engineering units.
  Polish Armed Forces in the West
 
 
 

Post-War
  - 100 M3A1
  - 15 M3A1s used by the Cambodian Army in 1954-1975.
 
  - captured from the Chinese Nationalist Army during the Chinese Civil War.
 
 
 
 
 
 
 
 
 
 
 
  Kingdom of Laos - 15 M3A1s used by the Royal Lao Army during the Laotian Civil War (1954-1975).
  - M3A1s used by the Regional Gendarmerie and the Lebanese Air Force in 1949-1959.
 
 
 
 
 
  - M3A1s used by the Portuguese Army in Africa during the Portuguese Colonial War (1961-1974).
 
 
  - captured Katangese vehicles used by ONUC forces.
 
  - 300 received during the Informbiro period.

See also
 List of "G" series military vehicles

References

Bibliography

External links

 WWII vehicles
 Photo gallery at OldCMP
 M3A1 Scout Car Photos at Prime Portal

Armoured cars of the United States
World War II armored fighting vehicles of the United States
World War II scout cars
World War II armoured fighting vehicles of Canada
Military vehicles introduced in the 1930s